Everett Fox is a scholar and translator of the Hebrew Bible. A graduate of Brandeis University, he is currently the Allen M. Glick Professor of Judaic and Biblical Studies and director of the program in Jewish Studies at Clark University.

Life 
He is the husband of Jewish educator Rabbi Cherie Koller-Fox and father of three children, Akiva Fox, Leora Koller-Fox, and Ezra Fox.

Education 
In 1968 Fox received a B.A. from Brandeis University, and in 1972 received a M.A. From 1975, Fox holds a Ph.D. from Brandeis University.

Academic work 
Fox is perhaps best known for his translation into English of the Torah. His translation is heavily influenced by the principles of Martin Buber and Franz Rosenzweig. Buber, in 1962, completed his translation of the Hebrew Bible into German. Fox, with Lawrence Rosenwald of Wellesley College, co-translated Buber and Rosenzweig's Scripture and Translation into English (Weissbort and Eysteinsson 562). The main guiding principle of Fox's work is that the aural aspects of the Hebrew text should be translated as closely as possible. Instances of Hebrew word play, puns, word repetition, alliteration, and other literary devices of sound are echoed in English and, as with Buber-Rosenzweig, the text is printed in linear, not paragraph, fashion. He has argued for the superiority of Biblical translations that preserve or reflect such Hebrew forms and pushes English further than does Robert Alter, whose translations are motivated by a similar appreciation of the character of the Hebrew original.

Fox's translation of the Torah was published in 1995 by Schocken Books (a division of Random House) as The Five Books of Moses. Fox continues to translate, and in 1999 published Give Us a King!, a translation of the books of Samuel. His translation of the complete Early Prophets (the books of Joshua, Judges, Samuel (revised) and Kings) was published in November 2014 as The Schocken Bible: Volume II.

Fox served as a religious consultant on the making of the film Prince of Egypt. In the 1970s, he and Cherie Koller-Fox co-created a board game called "Expulsion: Jewish Life in Spain from the Golden Age to 1492," which was shown on the TV show, Full Frontal with Samantha Bee, on November 29, 2016.

Selected publications 
 The Early Prophets: Joshua, Judges, Samuel, Kings, 2014. New York: Schocken Books. 
 Give Us a King!: A New English Translation of the Book of Samuel, 1999. New York: Schocken Books. 
 The Five Books of Moses: (The Schocken Bible, Volume 1)  A New English Translation with Commentary and Notes, 1995. New York: Schocken Books. 
 Scripture and Translation (translation of Buber and Rosenzweig, Die Schrift und ihre Verdeutschung) -- introduction, co-editor and co-translator with Lawrence Rosenwald. Bloomington: Indiana University Press. 1994.
 Stalking the Younger Brother: Some Models for Understanding a Biblical Motif. Journal for the Study of the Old Testament 18:45-68. 1993.
The Bible and Its World," in Barry Holtz, ed., The Schocken Guide to Jewish Books. New York: Schocken Books. 1992.

References

Weissbort, Daniel and Astradur Eysteinsson. 2006. Translation—Theory and Practice: A Historical Reader, (pp. 562–568 about Fox).  Oxford: Oxford University Press.

External links

Everett Fox at Schocken Books

 Updike's review of translation by Alter and Fox

Translators of the Bible into English
Old Testament scholars
Living people
Year of birth missing (living people)
Brandeis University alumni
Clark University faculty
American translation scholars
Jewish translators of the Bible